Scopula tahitiensis is a moth of the family Geometridae that is endemic to Tahiti.

References

External links

Moths described in 2003
Endemic fauna of Tahiti
Moths of Oceania
tahitiensis